Association football is the most popular sport in Switzerland. The Swiss Football Association was formed in 1895 and was a founder member of the sport's international governing body FIFA in 1904. The Swiss cities of Zürich and Nyon are home to FIFA and the European governing body UEFA respectively. The country played host to the 1954 World Cup and 2008 European Championship.

Switzerland has an extensive league system, with the Swiss Super League as the country's premier men's competition. There are also several cup competitions, most notably the national Swiss Cup.

The Swiss national team participated in the 2006 FIFA World Cup in Germany and were narrowly beaten by Ukraine on penalties in the round of 16. Switzerland co-hosted the UEFA Euro 2008 tournament together with Austria. They were eliminated in the group stage, although they did record a win against Portugal. The best international result was in 1954 when Switzerland, as the host, reached the quarter-finals of the World Cup. They also reached the World Cup quarter-finals in 1934 as well as 1938.

History

The first football club in Switzerland was the Lausanne Football and Cricket Club, founded in 1860 by English students. It was also the first football club created outside of England. The Swiss Football Association (ASF-SFV) is the highest body of professional football in Switzerland and was founded in 1895, although it joined the FIFA in 1904 and UEFA in 1954. The ASF-SFV organizes the Swiss Super League-the first and maximum league competition in the country- and the Swiss Cup, and manages the national men's and women's national team. Switzerland hosted the 1954 FIFA World Cup and, together with Austria, the UEFA Euro 2008.

Swiss football competitions

Men's football

 Super League: is the first division of Swiss football. It was founded in 1897 and is composed of 10 clubs (12 in 2023–24). The five teams with the most titles are Grasshopper Club Zürich, FC Basel, Servette FC from Geneva, FC Zürich and BSC Young Boys from Bern.
 Challenge League: is the second division in the Swiss league system. It consists of 10 clubs, of which the champion is promoted directly to the Super League. As of 2019, the second plays the promotion playoffs with ninth place in the Super League.
 Promotion League: is the third division in the Swiss league system. There are 18 teams. The champion is promoted directly to Challenge League. The two last teams are relegated.
 1st League Classic: is the fourth division in the Swiss league system. 48 clubs are divided into three groups.
 2nd League Interregional: is the fifth division in the league system of Switzerland. 76 clubs are placed into five groups.
 2. Liga: is the sixth division in the Swiss league system, where 17 groups contain 215 clubs.
 3. Liga
 4. Liga
 5. Liga

Non-league competitions
 Swiss Cup: is the national cup of Swiss football, organized by the Swiss Football Association and whose champion qualifies for the UEFA Europa Conference League.
 Uhrencup
 Coppa delle Alpi

Women's football

The Swiss women's football championship is divided into 6 levels.
 Women's Super League, the top level women's league: Founded in 1970,  it was originally known as Nationalliga A, until 2020. Since its renaming, the format was also adapted to include a regular season and a play-off stage.
 Nationalliga B
 First League, divided into three groups
 Second League, six interregional groups of 10-12 teams
 Third and Fourth Leagues are divided by regions
 Swiss Women's Cup, first carried out in 1975

Swiss Clubs in European Competitions
Clubs of the Swiss Super League may qualify for UEFA competitions. Switzerland is currently ranked 14th in the UEFA ranking. As such, five teams are eligible to compete in European competitions, two each in the UEFA Champions League qualifier and the UEFA Europa Conference League qualifier, and the winner of the Swiss Cup enters qualification for the UEFA Europa League. 

No Swiss team has ever won any major European trophy. 

Grasshopper Club Zürich is the only Swiss team to have won the UEFA Intertoto Cup, doing so twice in 2006 and 2008, while Basel were a runner-up in 2001, before the competition was discontinued in 2009. Prior to UEFA's involvement in the Intertoto Cup in 1995, multiple Swiss teams had emerged victorious.

Best Placement by Tournament

Historical UEFA Coefficient and Ranking

National team

The Swiss national team, in its various categories, is controlled by the Swiss Football Association.

The Swiss team played their first official match on 12 February 1905 in Paris against France, with the French winning 1-0. Switzerland has managed to qualify for 11 FIFA World Cups and five European Championships, including Euro 2008, where they were co-hosts together with Austria.

Women's national football team

The women's team debuted on 4 May 1972 against France in a match that ended 2-2 in Basel, and has qualified for the 2015 FIFA Women's World Cup and UEFA Women's  Euro 2017.

Bibliography

Jérôme Berthoud, Grégory Quin et Philippe Vonnard, Le football suisse : Des pionniers aux professionnels, Lausanne, Presses polytechniques et universitaires romandes, coll. « Le savoir suisse », 2016 Wayback Machine

+30,000-capacity Swiss football stadiums

See also
 List of Swiss football champions
 List of football clubs in Switzerland
 List of football stadiums in Switzerland
 1954 FIFA World Cup (hosted by Switzerland)
 2008 UEFA European Football Championship (co-hosted by Switzerland)

References